"See Saw" is a song written by Don Covay and Steve Cropper and performed by Covay.  The song reached #5 on the U.S. R&B chart and #44 on the Billboard Hot 100 in 1965.  The song appeared on his 1966 album, See Saw.

Aretha Franklin version
Aretha Franklin released a version of the song that reached #9 on the U.S. R&B chart and #14 on the Billboard Hot 100 in 1968.  The song appeared on her 1968 album, Aretha Now.

Other Versions
American jazz organist Dr. Lonnie Smith recorded an extended instrumental version on his 1969 album, Turning Point (Blue Note BST-84313); recorded at Rudy Van Gelder Studio on January 3, 1969.

Chart performance

Don Covay

Aretha Franklin

References

1965 songs
1965 singles
1968 singles
Songs written by Don Covay
Don Covay songs
Aretha Franklin songs
Atlantic Records singles
Soul songs
Songs written by Steve Cropper